The Piaggio NRG is a  scooter made by Piaggio from 1994 to 2020.

History
The first model (mc1) used a liquid-cooled, two-stroke engine. The mc2 differed from the mc1 only visually and later models (since 1998) had optional air-cooling and rear disc brakes (the Hi-Per2 engine). The mc3 saw not only further visual improvements, but also a rev counter, the new Hi-Per 2 engine, air-cooling (optional), rear disc brakes (optional) and direct fuel injection (optional). The NRG Power (introduced in 2005) changed drastically from the fairly similar 3 previous models. The NRG Power and mc3 were supplied in three versions:
NRG Power DT / NRG mc3 DT (air-cooled, rear drum brakes)
NRG Power DD / NRG mc3 DD (liquid-cooled, rear disc brakes. DD stands for "Double Disc")
NRG Power PureJet / NRG mc3 PureJet (direct fuel injection)
Piaggio and Gilera have produced models similar to the mc1:
NTT (10 inch rims and a front splitter)
Piaggio Typhoon / Gilera Typhoon (10 inch rims, different front body, air cooling)
Piaggio Storm / Gilera Storm (13 inch rims, Typhoon front body, air cooling)

Models
Piaggio NRG mc1 (1994-1996)
Piaggio NRG mc2 (1996-1998)
Piaggio NRG mc2 DD / mc2 extreme (1998-2000)
Piaggio NRG mc3 DD / DT / PureJet
Piaggio NRG Power DD / DT / PureJet (since 2005)
Piaggio NRG mc4

References

External links
 Official website

NRG
Motorcycles introduced in 1994
Mopeds
Two-stroke motorcycles